Dromistomus is a genus of beetles in the family Carabidae, containing the following species:

 Dromistomus complanatus (Bates, 1889)
 Dromistomus depressus Jeannel, 1948
 Dromistomus laticollis (Boheman, 1848)
 Dromistomus levis Jeannel, 1948
 Dromistomus tenuilimbatus Jeannel, 1948

References

Pterostichinae